Neosauroides (meaning "new kind of lizard found in Korea") is a Cretaceous ichnogenus of lizard found in South Korea. N. koreanensis is discovered from the Haman Formation, while N. innovatus is discovered from the Jinju Formation.

References

Trace fossils